HMCS Lévis was a  that served with the Royal Canadian Navy during the Second World War. She served primarily as a convoy escort in the Battle of the St. Lawrence and the Battle of the Atlantic. She was the second ship to bear the name of Lévis, the first being a Flower-class corvette that had been sunk earlier in the war. She was named for Lévis, Quebec.

Lévis was ordered in June 1942 as part of the 1942–1943 River-class building program. She was laid down on 25 February 1943 by Davie Shipbuilding & Repairing Co. Ltd. at Lauzon and launched 26 November 1943. She was commissioned into the Royal Canadian Navy on 21 July 1944 at Quebec City.

Background

The River-class frigate was designed by William Reed of Smith's Dock Company of South Bank-on-Tees. Originally called a "twin-screw corvette", its purpose was to improve on the convoy escort classes in service with the Royal Navy at the time, including the Flower-class corvette. The first orders were placed by the Royal Navy in 1940 and the vessels were named for rivers in the United Kingdom, giving name to the class. In Canada they were named for towns and cities though they kept the same designation. The name "frigate" was suggested by Vice-Admiral Percy Nelles of the Royal Canadian Navy and was adopted later that year.

Improvements over the corvette design included improved accommodation which was markedly better. For underwater targets, the River-class frigate was equipped with a Hedgehog anti-submarine mortar and depth charge rails aft and four side-mounted throwers.

River-class frigates were the first Royal Canadian Navy warships to carry the 147B Sword horizontal fan echo sonar transmitter in addition to the irregular ASDIC. This allowed the ship to maintain contact with targets even while firing unless a target was struck. Improved radar and direction-finding equipment improved the RCN's ability to find and track enemy submarines over the previous classes.

Canada originally ordered the construction of 33 frigates in October 1941. The design was too big for the shipyards on the Great Lakes so all the frigates built in Canada were built in dockyards along the west coast or along the St. Lawrence River. In all Canada ordered the construction of 60 frigates including ten for the Royal Navy that transferred two to the United States Navy.

War service
After working up in Bermuda, Lévis joined escort group EG 27 at Halifax, Nova Scotia in September. She remained with this unit until June 1945 performing anti-submarine patrols and convoy escort duty. It was during this period that she fought in the Battle of the St. Lawrence. On 4 June 1945 Lévis began a tropicalization refit at Lunenburg in preparation for service in the southern Pacific Ocean. The refit was completed on 26 November and she sailed for the west coast. Lévis arrived at Esquimalt, British Columbia on 30 January 1946 and was paid off there on 21 February. She was sold to Capital Iron & Metals Ltd. of Victoria, British Columbia in 1947. Her hull was stripped and she was sunk as a breakwater in Oyster Bay, British Columbia in 1948.

References
Notes

References
Macpherson, Ken; Burgess, John. The ships of Canada's naval forces 1910–1981 : a complete pictorial history of Canadian warships. Collins: Toronto, 1981. 

River-class frigates of the Royal Canadian Navy
1943 ships